The 1926–27 Southern Branch Grizzlies men's basketball team represented the Southern Branch of the University of California during the 1926–27 NCAA men's basketball season and were members of the Southern California Intercollegiate Athletic Conference. The Grizzlies were led by sixth year head coach Pierce "Caddy" Works. They finished the regular season with a record of 12–4, and were champions of their conference with a record of 9–1.

Previous season

The 1925–26 Southern Branch Grizzlies finished with a conference record of 14–2 and won their conference with a record of 10–0 under third year head coach Caddy Works.

Roster

Schedule

|-
!colspan=9 style=|Regular Season

Source

References

UCLA Bruins men's basketball seasons
Southern Branch Grizzlies Basketball
Southern Branch Grizzlies Basketball
Southern Branch